Associazione Sportiva Dilettantistica San Felice Gladiator 1912 or simply Gladiator is an Italian association football club, based in Santa Maria Capua Vetere, Campania. The club currently plays in Serie D.

History

From the foundation to 2012 
The club was founded in 1912 as Polisportiva Gladiator.

The club has played 4 seasons, from 1984–85 to 1985–86 and from 2001–02 to 2002–03, in Serie C2.

From 2012: S.F. Gladiator 
In summer 2012 after the acquisition of the sports title of Serie D club Nuvla San Felice, based in Nola, the club was renamed A.S.D. San Felice Gladiator.

Colours and badge 
The team's colours are black and blue.

Honours 
Serie D: 1983–84, 2000–01

References 

Football clubs in Campania
Association football clubs established in 1912
Serie C clubs
1912 establishments in Italy
Santa Maria Capua Vetere